Christopher Roper (1508/09–1558/59), of Lynsted, Kent, was an English politician.

He was a Member of Parliament (MP) for Rochester in  March 1553. He was the father of John Roper, who was raised to the peerage as the first Baron Teynham.

References

1509 births
1559 deaths
People from Lynsted
English MPs 1553 (Edward VI)
People from Rochester, Kent